Angry Penguins was an art and literary journal founded in 1940 by surrealist poet Max Harris, at the age of 18. Originally based in Adelaide, the journal moved to Melbourne in 1942 once Harris joined the Heide Circle, a group of avant-garde painters and writers who stayed at Heide, a property owned by art patrons John and Sunday Reed. Angry Penguins subsequently became associated with, and stimulated, an art movement that would later be known by the same name. Key figures of the movement include Sidney Nolan, Arthur Boyd, Joy Hester and Albert Tucker.

Origins and ethos 
Angry Penguins was a magazine first published in the South Australian capital of Adelaide. The title is derived from a phrase in Harris' poem "Mithridatum of Despair": "as drunks, the angry penguins of the night", and its use as a magazine title was suggested to Harris by C. R. Jury. The magazine's main Adelaide rival was the Jindyworobaks, a nationalist and anti-modernist literary movement promoting Indigenous Australian culture and the Australian bush ballad tradition. According to Angry Penguins poet Geoffrey Dutton, "we stayed with Yeats, Eliot and Auden, ... and left Lawson and Paterson to the Jindys." In 1942, Harris gained the patronage of John and Sunday Reed in Melbourne, and the magazine subsequently moved to the couple's home at Heide (now the Heide Museum of Modern Art).

The Angry Penguins artists were early Australian exponents of surrealism and expressionism, and included John Perceval, Guy Gray Smith, Arthur Boyd, Sidney Nolan, Danila Vassilieff, Albert Tucker and Joy Hester.

The Ern Malley hoax

Their interest in Surrealism led James McAuley and Harold Stewart during their time at the Directorate of Research and Civil Affairs to create the group's most famous event, the Ern Malley hoax and the subsequent trial for indecency. James McAuley and Harold Stewart submitted a group of poems that fitted in with the typical submissions featured in the magazine's 1944 autumn number, and attributed them to a recently deceased young poet named Ern Malley, who never actually existed. These poems were constructed as a pastiche of fragments pasted together nonsensically; McAuley and Stewart were critical of Modernism, and wanted to prove that it has no inherent value. The poems were received and published enthusiastically by the creators and patrons of the magazine. When it was revealed to be a hoax, the publication received negative backlash, and the affair tarnished the image of the magazine.

Criticism
The Communist Party of Australia publicly criticized Angry Penguins. In the August 1944 issue of the Communist Review, to support his assertion that the magazine "has nothing to offer to Australian art, and that its effect will be to destroy, not raise Australian standards" Vic O'Connor writes that editors of cultural publications are responsible for fostering cultural development as a part of the overall advancement of "standards of social and economic life in Australia", and that the editors of Angry Penguins are "completely indifferent" to this.

Legacy and influence
The Angry Penguins art movement was surveyed in the 1988 exhibition Angry Penguins and Realist Painting in Melbourne in the 1940s, held at the Hayward Gallery in London. In the exhibition's catalogue, English novelist C. P. Snow is quoted as saying that the Angry Penguins movement "was probably the last flowering of a 'national' modernism that a completely internationalised world of the arts was likely to see".

Cultural references 
 My Life as a Fake is a 2003 novel by Peter Carey based on the Ern Malley hoax. It is a first-person narrative from the point of view of a young woman editing a literary magazine who encounters the perpetrator of the hoax (called Bob McCorkle, not Ern Malley, in the story) after many years. Carey is more interested in the idea of "magical thinking" than a literal recount; the Ern Malley character is a flesh-and-blood person who haunts his "creator."
 In Richard Flanagan's Booker Prize-winning novel The Narrow Road to the Deep North (2013), the main character, Dorrigo Evans, meets the love of his life at the launch of Angry Penguins.

See also
Ern Malley
Alfred Tipper
Museum of Modern Art Australia
John Reed
Heidi Circle
1944 in Australian Literature
Sokal affair

References

External links
cultureandrecreation.gov.au
Ernmalley
The Angry Penguins

20th-century Australian literature
1940 establishments in Australia
1946 disestablishments in Australia
Australian art movements
Defunct literary magazines published in Australia
Literary collaborations
Magazines established in 1940
Magazines disestablished in 1946